Brackendale Eagles Provincial Park is a provincial park in British Columbia, Canada, located on the Squamish River adjacent to Brackendale, a suburban neighbourhood of Squamish. It is notable for its eagle population during the winter months and is inaccessible to visitors.

History

In 1992, the government of British Columbia announced its Protected Areas Strategy that would protect 12% of the province by 2000. The west side of the Squamish River, which is recognized as a critical wintering site for bald eagles, was selected for protection as part of the strategy, and Brackendale Eagles Provincial Park was formally established in 1999. The park is the holder of the world record for bald eagles counted, with 3,769 in 1994.

Ecology

The park is a critical wintering site for bald eagles, who feed off salmon in the Squamish and Cheakamus Rivers during the winter, and the park hosts approximately 148 other species of bird. The park is also home to several large mammals species; these are black bear, Roosevelt elk, bobcat, cougar, grey wolf, Columbian black-tailed deer, and coyote. There are also many small mammals, such as northern flying squirrels, yellow pine chipmunks, and snowshoe hares. Reptiles and amphibians are also known to be present in the park, although with a smaller variety of species than that of the park's mammals.

References

Provincial parks of British Columbia
Sea-to-Sky Corridor
1999 establishments in British Columbia